The Darwin Football Club, nicknamed, Buffaloes, is an Australian rules football club, playing in the Northern Territory Football League. It is the third oldest football club in the Northern Territory. Darwin has won the second most premierships in the NTFL competition. It has produced a large number of Australian Footballers who went on to play professionally in the Australian Football League.

Club achievements

History
The club was formed in 1916. They've been known as Warriors in 1917, Vestey’s in 1918, Buffaloes in 1926, Darwin in 1963 and eventually the Darwin Buffaloes in 2010.

The Buffaloes Premier League Men have won 23 titles in the competition. Their most recent win was in the 2005/06 NTFL Grand Final.

The Buffaloes (Buffettes) Premier League Women won the 2016/17 & 2021/22 NTFL Grand Finals.

The club has produced AFL players including Matthew Whelan, Andrew McLeod, Matthew Ahmat, Robert Ahmat, Matthew Campbell, Darryl White, Matthew Whelan, Cameron Stokes, Joe Anderson, Jed Anderson and Malcolm Rosas Jr.

External links

Official Facebook
Full Points Footy Profile for Darwin

Sport in Darwin, Northern Territory
Australian rules football clubs in the Northern Territory
1916 establishments in Australia
Australian rules football clubs established in 1916